The Royal Norwegian Navy is the branch of the Norwegian Armed Forces responsible for naval operations of Norway. , the Royal Norwegian Navy consists of approximately 3,700 personnel (9,450 in mobilized state, 32,000 when fully mobilized) and 70 vessels, including 4 heavy frigates, 6 submarines, 14 patrol boats, 4 minesweepers, 4 minehunters, 1 mine detection vessel, 4 support vessels and 2 training vessels. It also includes the Coast Guard.

This navy has a history dating back to 955. From 1509 to 1814, it formed part of the navy of Denmark-Norway, also referred to as the "Common Fleet". Since 1814, the Royal Norwegian Navy has again existed as a separate navy.

In Norwegian, all its naval vessels since 1946 bear ship prefix "KNM", Kongelig Norske Marine (which accurately translates to Royal Norwegian Navy/Naval vessel). In English, they are permitted still to be ascribed prefix "HNoMS", meaning "His/Her Norwegian Majesty's Ship" ("HNMS" could be also used for the Royal Netherlands Navy, for which "HNLMS" is used instead). Coast Guard vessels are given the prefix "KV" for KystVakt (Coast Guard) in Norwegian and permissibly, and less ambiguously in English, are styled "NoCGV", Norwegian Coast Guard Vessel.



History 
The history of Norwegian state-operated naval forces is long, and goes back to the leidang which was first established by King Håkon the Good at the Gulating in 955, although variants of the Leidang had at that time already existed for hundreds of years. During the last part of the Middle Ages the system of levying of ships, equipment, and manpower for the leidang was mainly used to levying tax and existed as such into the 17th Century.

During most of the union between Norway and Denmark the two countries had a common fleet. This fleet was established by King Hans in 1509 in Denmark. A large proportion of the crew and officers in this new Navy organisation were Norwegian. In 1709 there were about 15,000 personnel enrolled in the common fleet; of these 10,000 were Norwegian. When Tordenskjold carried out his famous raid at Dynekil in 1716 more than 80 percent of the sailors and 90 percent of the soldiers in his force were Norwegian. Because of this the Royal Norwegian Navy shares its history from 1509 to 1814 with the Royal Danish Navy.

The modern, separate Royal Norwegian Navy was founded (restructured) on April 12, 1814, by Prince Christian Fredrik on the remnants of the Dano-Norwegian Navy. At the time of separation, the Royal Dano-Norwegian Navy was in a poor state and Norway was left with the lesser share. All officers of Danish birth were ordered to return to Denmark and the first commander of the Norwegian navy became Captain Thomas Fasting. It then consisted of 39 officers, seven brigs (one more under construction), one schooner-brig, eight gun schooners, 46 gun chalups and 51 gun barges. April 1, 1815, the Royal Norwegian Navy's leadership was reorganized into a navy ministry, and Fasting became the first navy minister.

Norway retained its independent armed forces, including the navy, during the union with Sweden. During most of the union the navy was subjected to low funding, even though there were ambitious plans to expand it. In the late 19th century, the fleet was increased to defend a possible independent Norway from her Swedish neighbours.

In 1900, just five years prior to the separation from Sweden, the navy, which was maintained for coastal defense, consisted of: two British-built coastal defence ships ( and  – each armored and displacing about 3,500 tons), four ironclad monitors, three unarmored gun vessels, twelve gunboats, sixteen small (sixty ton) gunboats, and a flotilla of twenty-seven torpedo boats. These were operated by 116 active duty officers (with an additional sixty reserve) and 700 petty officers and seamen.

Norway was neutral during World War I, but the armed forces were mobilised to protect Norway's neutrality. The neutrality was sorely tested – the nation's merchant fleet suffered heavy casualties to German U-boats and commerce raiders.

World War II began for the Royal Norwegian Navy on April 8, 1940, when the German torpedo boat Albatross attacked the guard ship Pol III. The German invasion fleet heading for Oslo was significantly delayed when Oscarsborg Fortress opened fire with two of its three old 28 cm guns, followed by the 15 cm guns on Kopås on the eastern side of the Drøbak strait. The artillery pieces inflicted heavy damage on the German heavy cruiser Blücher, which was subsequently sunk by torpedoes fired from Oscarsborg's land-based torpedo battery. Blücher sank with over 1,000 casualties among its crew and soldiers aboard. The German invasion fleet – believing Blücher had struck a mine – retreated south and called for air strikes on the fortress. This delay allowed King Haakon VII of Norway and the Royal family, as well as the government, to escape capture.

 On June 7, 1940, thirteen vessels, five aircraft and 500 men from the Royal Norwegian Navy followed the King to the United Kingdom and continued the fight from bases there until the war ended. The number of men was steadily increased as Norwegians living abroad, civilian sailors and men escaping from Norway joined the Royal Norwegian Navy. Funds from Nortraship were used to buy new ships, aircraft and equipment.

Ten ships and 1,000 men from the Royal Norwegian Navy participated in the Normandy Invasion in 1944.

During the war the navy operated 118 ships, at the end of the war it had 58 ships and 7,500 men in service. They lost 27 ships, 18 fishing boats (of the Shetland bus) and 933 men in World War II.

The navy had its own air force from 1912 to 1944.

The building of a new fleet in the 1960s was made possible with substantial economic support from the United States. During the cold war, the navy was optimized for sea denial in coastal waters to make an invasion from the sea as difficult and costly as possible.  With that mission in mind, the Royal Norwegian Navy consisted of a large number of small vessels and up to 15 small diesel-electric submarines. The navy is now replacing those vessels with a smaller number of larger and more capable vessels.

The Royal Norwegian Navy Museum is dedicated to the preservation and promotion of Norway's naval history.

Ensign and Jack

Bases 

Some of The Royal Norwegian Navy's bases are:
 Haakonsvern, Bergen (main base for the navy).
 Ramsund, in Tjeldsund, between the towns of Harstad and Narvik (special operations/Marinejegerkommandoen)
 Trondenes Fort, Harstad (Coastal Ranger Command)
 Sortland (Coast Guard Squadron North)
 KNM Harald Haarfagre, Stavanger (Recruitment base for navy and air force conscripts)
 Karljohansvern, Horten (training facility)

Organization 
The Navy is organized into the Fleet, the Coast Guard, and the main bases.

The Fleet consists of:
 Fleet Chief Staff,
 1st Frigate Squadron (1. Fregattskvadron)
 Submarine Branch (Ubåtvåpenet)
 1st Corvette Squadron (1. Korvettskvadron)
 1st Minesweeper Squadron (1. Minerydderskvadron)
 Fleet Logistics Commando (Marinens Logistikkkommando)
 Coastal Ranger Commando (Kystjegerkommandoen)
 Naval EOD Command (Minedykkerkommandoen)

The Naval Schools are:
 Royal Norwegian Naval Basic Training Establishment, KNM Harald Haarfagre, Stavanger
 Royal Norwegian Navy Officer Candidate School, Horten and Bergen
 Royal Norwegian Naval Academy, Laksevåg, Bergen
 Royal Norwegian Naval Training Establishment, KNM Tordenskjold, Haakonsvern, Bergen

Two of the schools of the Navy retain ship prefixes, reminiscent of Royal Navy practises.

Museum: Royal Norwegian Navy Museum, Horten

Fleet units and vessels (present)

Submarine Branch 
The submarine fleet consists of several  submarines.

"Ubåtvåpenet" maintain six Ula-class submarines:
 Ula (S300)
 Utsira (S301)
 Utstein (S302)
 Utvær (S303)
 Uthaug (S304)
 Uredd (S305)

1st Frigate Squadron 

Note:  These ships are generally considered destroyers by their officers and other navies due to their size and role. Helge Ingstad (F313) was decommissioned and sold for scrap after a collision with an oil tanker in November 2018 severely damaged the ship.

 . Five vessels commissioned. Since late 2018, four in service.
 (F310) Launched June 3, 2004. Commissioned April 5, 2006.
 (F311) Launched May 25, 2005. Commissioned May 21, 2007.
 (F312) Launched April 28, 2006. Commissioned April 30, 2008.
 (F314) Launched February 11, 2009. Commissioned January 18, 2011.

1st Corvette Squadron 

The Coastal Warfare fleet consists of  corvettes.

 Missile Patrol Boat (Skjold class), all 6  commissioned:

 Skjold (P960) Launched September 22, 1998. Commissioned April 17, 1999
 Storm (P961) Launched November 1, 2006.
 Skudd (P962) Launched April 30, 2007.
 Steil (P963) Launched January 15, 2008.
 Glimt (P964)
 Gnist (P965)

Mine Branch 

1st Mine Clearing Squadron
 Flagship
 Nordkapp A531 (1980) - former coast guard patrol vessel (W320) commissioned into navy service effective 1 November 2022.
  (1994)
 Oksøy M340
 Karmøy M341
 Måløy M342
 Hinnøy M343

  (1996):
 Alta M350
 Otra  M351
 Rauma M352
 Orkla M353 (Ship sunk on 19 November 2002)
 Glomma M354

Coastal Ranger Command 
 Tactical Boat Squadron
 Combat Boat 90N (1996)
Trondenes
Skrolsvik
Kråkenes
Stangnes
Kjøkøy
Mørvika
Kopås
Tangen
Oddane
Malmøya
Hysnes
Brettingen
Løkhaug
Søviknes
Hellen
Osternes
Fjell
Lerøy
Torås
Møvik

Norwegian Naval EOD Commando

Fleet Logistics Command 
 Supply/underway replenishment ship Maud (A530). Acquired in November 2018 and first "maiden deployment" initiated in September 2021.

 Royal yacht:
 Norge (A553) 
 Magnus Lagabøte (A537)
 Olav Trygvasson (A536)

Coast Guard units and vessels 

 Harstad
 Svalbard
 Andenes
 Heimdal
 Farm
 Barentshav
 Sortland
 Bergen
 Ålesund
 Nornen
 Njord
 Tor

Future vessels 
Norway has prioritized replacing its current submarine fleet. In February 2017 the German manufacturer Thyssen Krupp was selected to deliver four new submarines, of the Type 212CD submarine-class design, starting in the latter 2020s  to replace the Ula-class boats. A firm build contract with Thyssen Krupp was anticipated in the first half of 2020 as part of a joint program under which Norway will procure four submarines and Germany two. However, as of the end of 2020 a contract had not yet been signed. In March 2021 it was indicated that an agreement had been reached between Norway and Germany to initiate the acquisition program, pending approval by the Bundestag. The contract was signed in July 2021 and construction of the first vessel is to begin in 2023. Delivery of the first boat to the Royal Norwegian Navy is anticipated in 2029.

The Coast Guard is replacing its existing Nordkapp-class vessels with significantly larger ice-capable ships, each displacing just under 10,000 tonnes. The three new Jan Mayen-class ships will be armed with a 57mm main gun and be capable of operating up to two medium-sized helicopters. The ships have an overall length of 446 feet with a beam of 72 feet and a draft of 20 feet. The maximum speed will be 22 knots with more than 60 days endurance and the complement will be up to 100 people. The first ship, KV Jan Mayen, was launched by the Vard Tulcea shipyard in Romania in 2021 and towed to the Vard Langsten shipyard in Tomrefjord for completion. She was christened in November 2022, having started builder's sea trials in October. Delivery was anticipated in early 2023. The second ship of the class, KV Bjørnøya, was transferred to Norway for her final fit out at the Vard Langsten yard in February/March 2022 followed by the third and final ship, KV Hopen, in January 2023.

In early 2023 it was announced that the Navy was seeking a new class of coastal Ranger commando vessels to replace the CB90-class vessels. To be procured under Project P6380, the vessels are to have a top speed of 45 knots, stay at sea for up to a week and hold a crew of up to six personnel along with a coastal ranger platoon, its equipment or, alternatively, a UAV under 150kg for day/night operations. Deliveries are envisaged between 2026 and 2028.

The 2020 Norwegian defence plan envisages the replacement of the current major surface vessels "after 2030". Decisions concerning
type and number of vessels are to be "made in the next planning period".

Insignia

Commissioned officer ranks
The rank insignia of commissioned officers.

Other ranks
The rank insignia of non-commissioned officers and enlisted personnel.

See also
 List of Royal Norwegian Navy ships
 Free Norwegian Forces

References

Footnotes

External links 

Official website of the Royal Norwegian Navy  
English, Official site 
Royal Norwegian Navy, Equipment Facts 
 Facts & Figures: The Royal Norwegian Navy (Norwegian Defence – Official Website) 
Befalsbladet 1/2004 
Royal Norwegian Navy history page 
Another Royal Norwegian Navy History page 
Royal Norwegian Navy Museum web page 
Royal Norwegian Navy Museum web page at mil.no 
Fakta om Forsvaret 2006 , issued January 2006 by the Ministry of Defense, 
Helle, 1995, p. 196.

 
Military of Norway
Military units and formations established in 1814
1814 establishments in Norway